Leptocollonia innocens is a species of sea snail, a marine gastropod mollusk in the family Colloniidae.

Description
The shell grows to a size of 7 mm.

Distribution
This species occurs in the Weddell Sea, Antarctica

References

Colloniidae
Gastropods described in 1912